KBIH may refer to:

 Eastern Sierra Regional Airport (ICAO code KBIH)
 KBIH-LP, a low-power radio station (94.1 FM) licensed to serve Houston, Texas, United States